Kiltearn (Gaelic: Cill Tighearna) is a parish in Ross and Cromarty, Scotland.  It is in the Presbytery of Ross.

The principal settlement is the village of Evanton, and the parish extends almost to Dingwall and about halfway to Alness. The old Kiltearn church and burial ground are on the shore of the Cromarty Firth. The church is ruinous but dates from 1790. The current church (Free Church Continuing) is on the main street in Evanton.

Churchyard

There is gravestone with a warning from Thomas Hog in the parish churchyard. It was renewed in 1940.
Very Rev Murdoch MacQueen Moderator of the General Assembly of the Free Church of Scotland who died in 1912 is buried there.
The churchyard contains several Polish war graves from the Second World War.
According to 19th century historian Alexander Mackenzie, Robert Mor Munro, 15th Baron of Foulis who died in 1588 was the first Munro chief to be buried at Kiltearn and break away from his ancestor's usual custom of being buried at Chanonry. Mackenzie also states that the following Munro chiefs were also buried at Kiltearn: Robert Munro, 16th Baron of Foulis (d.1589), Hector Munro, 17th Baron of Foulis (d.1603), Sir Robert Munro, 3rd Baronet (d.1666), Sir John Munro, 4th Baronet (d.1697), and Sir Robert Munro, 5th Baronet (d.1729).
The 16th century churchman Donald Munro was buried in Kiltearn, "a little to the east of the burial ground of the family of Foulis", although the grave is not  marked.
George Munro, 1st of Obsdale (d.1589) was buried at Kiltearn.

Notes

References

Ross and Cromarty
Civil parishes of Scotland
Parishes in Ross and Cromarty